Goodwood Circuit is a historic venue for both two- and four-wheeled motorsport in the United Kingdom. The  circuit is situated near Chichester, West Sussex, close to the south coast of England, on the estate of Goodwood House, and completely encircles Chichester/Goodwood Airport. This is the racing circuit dating from 1948, not to be confused with the separate hillclimb course located at Goodwood House and first used in 1936.

History 1948–1966 
The racing circuit began life as the perimeter track of RAF Westhampnett airfield, which was constructed during World War II as a relief airfield for RAF Tangmere. The first race meeting took place on 18 September 1948, organised by the Junior Car Club and sanctioned by the Duke of Richmond and Gordon. The winner of the first race was P. de F. C. Pycroft, in his 2,664 c.c. Stirling Moss won the 500cc race (later to become Formula 3), followed by Eric Brandon and "Curly" Dryden, all in Coopers.

Goodwood became famous for its Glover Trophy non-championship Formula One race, the Goodwood Nine Hours sports car endurance races run in 1952, 1953 and 1955, and the Tourist Trophy sports car race, run here between 1958 and 1964. The cars that raced in those events can be seen recreating (in shorter form) the endurance races at the Goodwood Revival each year in the Sussex trophy and the Royal Automobile Club Tourist Trophy (RAC TT).

The original circuit layout featured a fast left-hand curve between the Woodcote corner and the start-finish line, with the pit lane on the infield side of the curve's exit. At first, the chicane was made using straw bales and boarding, before brick walls were constructed in 1953. Despite a number of accidents this brick chicane survived until the circuit's closure for racing in 1966, before it was rammed and destroyed in the mid-1970s by a transporter belonging to Team Surtees that was leaving the circuit after a test session. When the circuit was restored in the late 1990s, the chicane was remade using polystyrene blocks.

Goodwood has, over the years, played host to many famous drivers: Mike Hawthorn and Graham Hill had their first single seat races here, Roger Penske visited in 1963, and Jim Clark and Jack Sears competed in 1964. The accident that ended Stirling Moss's international career happened at St. Mary's in 1962.

Donald Campbell demonstrated his Bluebird CN7 Land Speed Record car at Goodwood in July 1960 at its initial public launch, and again in July 1962, before the car was shipped to Australia – where it finally broke the record in 1964.

Goodwood saw its last race meeting for over 30 years in 1966, because the owners did not want to modify the track with more chicanes to control the increased speeds of modern racing cars. The last event of the era was a club meeting organised by the British Automobile Racing Club on 2 July 1966. The lap record was a 1 minute and 20.4 seconds set by both Jackie Stewart and Jim Clark, in the 1965 Glover Trophy, the final formula one race at the circuit.

Goodwood Nine Hours

Testing 
The circuit claimed the life of McLaren founder Bruce McLaren in a testing accident on 2 June 1970. The accident happened on Lavant Straight, when a rear bodywork failure on his McLaren M8D Can-Am car caused it to spin and leave the track, hitting a bunker. The car would go on to win the opening event of that year's Can-Am Championship.

Events
Goodwood is noted for its annual Festival of Speed and Goodwood Revival events.

Goodwood Festival of Speed

The Goodwood Festival of Speed is an annual hill climb, held in late June or early July not on the circuit, but in the nearby grounds of Goodwood House. It features historic and modern motor-racing vehicles. In 2010, the event had over 176,000 visitors over 4 days.

Goodwood Revival

Following the success of the Festival of Speed hill climb, racing returned to the Goodwood circuit in 1998.
The Goodwood Revival is a three-day festival held each September for the types of cars and motorcycles that would have competed during the circuit's original period, 1948–1966. Historic aircraft help to complete the vintage feel. In 2008, a crowd of 68,000 people attended the event on the main Sunday - 9,000 more than in 2007. The track is now used for classic races, track days, and try-out days. Nearly everyone dresses up in vintage outfit from mods and rockers to racing drivers and just smart period clothes.

Other events

In 2009, the Mongol Rally, a charity fundraising car rally to Mongolia, moved its starting point from Hyde Park, London to Goodwood. Entrants are on show to the public in the paddock before beginning the rally with a parade lap of the circuit.

The National Finals of the Greenpower schools electric car racing challenge takes place at Goodwood each year. The Greenpower challenge is a nationwide series of electric vehicle endurance races for schools, who  build their own 24 volt single-seater racing cars. There is also a corporate version of the race, featuring teams like Lola, Jaguar Land Rover, Bentley Motors and Prodrive.

The 'Breakfast Club' was introduced in March 2006. This is a semi regular free to enter, and open-to-all monthly gathering of drivers and riders who come to view each other's cars, bikes etc. Each meeting is themed with striking examples of the day’s theme paraded on the start finish straight.

The circuit also hosted the 1982 UCI Road World Championships for cycle racing, notable for the men's professional race, which saw a late breakaway by the American rider Jacques Boyer being closed down by a pack led by Boyer's teammate (and future triple Tour de France winner and double Road World Champion) Greg LeMond.

The circuit was used as a filming location in the historical drama series Downton Abbey.

In May 2019 the track was added into Gran Turismo Sport as a free update.

In 2020, due to the COVID-19 pandemic, the Festival of Speed, members and Revival meetings were cancelled and replaced by an event called Speedweek combining elements from all three events.

Race Lap Records
The all-time outright lap record is 1:09.914, set by Nick Padmore in an Arrows A11, during the 2020 Goodwood Speedweek timed shootout event. The fastest official race lap records at the Goodwood Circuit are listed as:

See also 
 Brighton Speed Trials
 British Automobile Racing Club
 Firle Hill Climb
 Gurston Down Motorsport Hillclimb
 Lewes Speed Trials
 Thruxton Circuit in Thruxton, Hampshire
 Brooklands circuit in Weybridge, Surrey

Notes

References

External links

Goodwood
500 Owners Association
Greenpower

1948 establishments in the United Kingdom
FIA Grade 4 circuit
Goodwood estate
Motorsport venues in England
Sports venues in West Sussex